Bill McNeight was a New Zealand rugby league player who represented New Zealand.

Playing career
McNeight first made the New Zealand side in 1936, while playing for the West Coast. He played in two test matches for New Zealand that year and also played for the South Island.

By 1938 McNeight had moved to Auckland, joining the Newton Rangers club. He captained New Zealand on their 1938 tour of Australia, however no test matches were played on tour.

References

New Zealand rugby league players
New Zealand national rugby league team players
West Coast rugby league team players
South Island rugby league team players
New Zealand national rugby league team captains
Newton Rangers players
Auckland rugby league team players
Rugby league second-rows
Place of birth missing
1907 births
1966 deaths